This is a list of football transfers in the summer transfer window in the 2018–19 season of the Argentine Primera División.

Aldosivi

In:

Out:

Argentinos Juniors

In:

Out:

Atlético Tucumán

In:

Out:

Banfield

In:

Out:

Belgrano

In:

Out:

Boca Juniors

In:

Out:

Colón

In:

Out:

Defensa y Justicia

In:

Out:

Estudiantes

In:

Out:

Gimnasia

In:

Out:

Godoy Cruz

In:

Out:

Huracán

In:

Out:

Independiente

In:

Out:

Lanús

In:

Out:

Newell's Old Boys

In:

Out:

Patronato

In:

Out:

Racing

In:

Out:

River Plate

In:

Out:

Rosario Central

In:

Out:

San Lorenzo

In:

Out:

San Martín de San Juan

In:

Out:

San Martín de Tucumán

In:

Out:

Talleres

In:

Out:

Tigre

In:

Out:

Unión

In:

Out:

Vélez Sarsfield

In:

Out:

References 

Football transfers winter 2018–19
Transfers
2018–19